Beaver Brae (BBSS) (2016 population 600) is a secondary school situated in Kenora, Ontario, Canada.

Beaver Brae Secondary School is home to grades seven through twelve and has 65 staff members. The school offers trades, college, and university level programs.

Beaver Brae Secondary School provides a course calendar that features nearly two hundred courses. In addition to the major subject areas of English, Math, Science, Social Sciences, French (Core and Extended) and Physical Education, students may take classes in Instrumental Music, Guitar, Vocal Music, Visual Art, Drama, Construction, Automotive Technology, Communications, Business, Foods and Nutrition, and Hospitality and Tourism. Other courses offered at Beaver Brae include Outdoor Education, Ojibwe, Native Studies, Computer Engineering, Law and Information Technology.

Beaver Brae Secondary School has notable alumni including professional hockey player, Stanley Cup champion and 2010 Winter Olympics Gold Medal winner Mike Richards. Both Mike Smith, who competed in the 1988 Olympics, and Kyle Koch, a former professional canadian football offensive linemen, were educated at Beaver Brae. UFC fighter Jesse Bongfeldt attended Beaver Brae; he made his debut at UFC 124 and fought at UFC 131. Alumna Jasmine Lorimer was Canada's first-ever Bachelorette in the reality television dating game show The Bachelorette Canada. Former student Eric Melillo was elected to represent Kenora in the House of Commons of Canada in the 2019 Canadian federal election. Melillo is the youngest Conservative MP ever elected in Canada and the youngest in the 43rd Canadian Parliament. Professional angler Jeff Gustafson was educated at Beaver Brae and became the second Canadian to win a Bass Anglers Sportsman Society elite series event in 2021.

Renovations
In 1989 there was a high tech renovation. A library, music room, and art room were added in 1992. In 2000-2001 there was an addition consisting of four classrooms and a gym. Beaver Brae was updated with a student atrium in 2007. The atrium holds paintings which were painted by students, a big screen TV, projectors, pictures and awards. The high school is due to receive $6 million upgrade to the tech wing, parking lot and field, with completion estimated at February 2020.

Activities
The school has a concert band, choir and drama programs.

Sports
Beaver Brae has a rich sporting history with achievements at the local and provincial level. Beaver Brae sports teams include volleyball, basketball, soccer, badminton, football, hockey, curling, and cheerleading. The teams have won NorWOSSA and NWOSSAA titles, and OFSAA medals.

The Broncos football team joined the Winnipeg High School Football League (WHSFL) in 2001. In their inaugural season, the team won the league's 'A' title.

The Beaver Brae senior boys volleyball team won OFSAA 'AA' bronze medals in 2007 and 2009.

Beaver Brae hosted the 'AA' OFSAA championships for female volleyball and soccer during the 2008/2009 school year.

Despite not having track and field team since the 1990s, the school still holds NWOSSAA records. Some of the records include the senior boys triple and long jump records and the senior girls 400m and high jump records.

In 2013, the Bronco Cheerleading team won The Cheer Evolution Canadian Nationals in Niagara Falls, claiming the schools first national title.

A List of Beaver Brae's NorWOSSA championships:

Medals won at the OFSAA championships:

Notable alumni
Jeff Gustafson, Bass Anglers Sportsman Society Angler
Kyle Koch, CFL player
Jasmine Lorimer, The Bachelorette Canada
Eric Melillo, politician
Mike Richards, NHL player
Mike Smith, Olympic decathlete

See also
List of high schools in Ontario

References

External links
Beaver Brae Secondary School
NorWOSSA 
OFSAA

High schools in Ontario
Kenora
Schools in Kenora District
Educational institutions established in 1963
1963 establishments in Ontario